Louth railway station was a station in Louth, Lincolnshire, England. It served as a junction for several different now closed lines which converged on the town.

The closure of the station has left Louth which has over 16,000 residents the largest town in Lincolnshire without a railway station.

History

The foundation stone of Louth railway station was formally laid on 8 July 1847 by Miss Charlotte Alington Pye, a popular ballad writer of the time (who used the pseudonym "Claribel" from a Tennyson poem). The architects of the station buildings were John Grey Weightman and Matthew Ellison Hadfield of Sheffield.

The station was damaged by bombing on 19 February 1941 killing a local man, George Bradley, who was the fireman of an engine shunting in the goods yard.

Louth Station was closed to passengers in 1970. The line northwards to Grimsby remained open for freight until 1980. A 5-car diesel multiple unit formed a special into Louth on 20 December 1980; at the time, the only remaining track was into the bay platform No. 1. The station building was saved from demolition and converted into flats. It is a Grade II listed building.

Preservation future

The Lincolnshire Wolds Railway plans to eventually extend their running line to Louth, however the original station building and the surrounding area cannot be reused as the terminus of the LWR, as it has been converted for residential use, and the former goods yard is now a mix of housing and industrial/retail outlets.

A proposed new station will be built approx. 3/4 mile to the north of the original station. Louth North signalbox still stands in its original position by the adjacent level crossing. This has now been converted to a house.

Route

References

External links
 Louth station on navigable 1946 O. S. map
 Louth station on Subterranea Britannica
Station in 1954

Disused railway stations in Lincolnshire
Former Great Northern Railway stations
Railway stations in Great Britain opened in 1848
Railway stations in Great Britain closed in 1980
Louth, Lincolnshire
Beeching closures in England
John Grey Weightman railway stations
Matthew Ellison Hadfield railway stations
Grade II listed buildings in Lincolnshire